This a partial list of glacial moraines. They are arranged by continents and divided by related hydrologic basins. This list is incomplete.  Please improve the listing.

North America

Moraines of the Great Lakes Region

Lake Ontario Basin

  Oak Ridge
  Alden
  Buffalo
  Niagara Falls

 Forest
 Gowanda
 Hamburg
 Marilla
 Alden

 Pembroke
 Batavia
 Barre
Alboin

Lake Erie Basin

  Waterloo 
 Salamonie
  Trafalgar
  Defiance
  Fort Wayne

  Wabash
  Mississinewa
  Packerton

  Union City
  Shelbyville
  Illinoian

Lake Huron Basin
 Port Huron
 Chesanings
 West Haven
 Henderson
 Owosso
 Flint
 Otisville
 St. Johns
 Fowler
 Lyons
 Tawas
 Alden

Saginaw lobe 
 Charlotte
 Tekonsha
 Kalamazoo
 Sturgis
 Lagrange
 Middlebury
 New Paris
 Bremen
 Maxinkuckee

Interlobate ‘thumb’ of Michigan 
 Port Huron
 Portland
 Lyons
 Fowler
 Imlay and Goodland
 Otter Lake (St. Johns)
 Otisville
 Deanville
 Mayville
 Owosso
 Yale
 St. Juniata

Lake Michigan Basin

  Manistee
  Port Huron
  Lake Border

 Valparaiso
 Tinley
 Park Ridge
 Kalamazoo

 Marseilles
 Bloomington
 Champaign
 Cerro Gordo
  Shelbyville
  Illinoian

Lake Superior Basin

  Beroun
 Mille Lacs
 Wright
 Cromwell

 Draco
 Cloquet
 Thompson
 Kerrick

 Nickerson
 Fond du Lac
 Highland 
 Grand Marais
  Marenisco

Moraines of the Quebec and Ontario, Canada 

 Oak Ridges – Ontario
 Trafalgar – Ontario
 Waterloo – Ontario
 Dixville – Quebec
 Cherry River–East-Angus – Quebec
 Ulverton-Tingwick – Quebec

Moraines of the Maritimes of Canada and NE United States
 Cape Cod - Massachusetts
 North Shore (Long Island)
 Harbor Hill moraine - Long Island, New York
 Hammonasset Beach State Park

Moraines of Western Canada 
  Beaver Hills - Alberta

Moraines of the Great Plains of the United States
 Leaf Hills, Minnesota

Moraines of the U.S. and Canadian Rocky Mountains
Withrow Moraine and Jameson Lake Drumlin Field – Washington

Europe 
Lüneburg Heath – Germany
Rogen moraine –  Sweden, Norway
Lake Rogen – Sweden
Pulju moraine –  Finland
Salpausselkä – Finland
Sevetti moraine –  Finland
Trollgarden – Norway
Veiki moraine –  Sweden, Norway
Raet - Norway, Sweden, Finland
La Serra morainic amphitheater of Ivrea - Piedmont, Italy

Antarctica

Dart
Dovers
Elephant
Løken
Moraine Fjord - South Georgia
Pinafore
Reckling
Two Step

Queen Maud Land
Austbanen
Bremotet
Furdesanden
Henry
Mel
Sanbakken
Sandeidet
Schussel
Tvireta
Vestbanen

Ross Dependency
Bowsprit
Chain
Flotsam
Hells Gate
Jetsam
Knobhead
Shipwreck
The Strand
Swithinbank

South America

  Rio Blanco  - Argentina
 Hatcher  - Argentina
 Caracoles - Argentina
 Gorra de Poivre - Argentina
 Horcones – Argentina
 Penitentes
 Punt de Vacas
 Lago Sarmiento I – South Patagonian Icefield - Argentina
 Lago Sarmiento II – South Patagonian Icefield - Argentina
 Lago Sarmiento III – South Patagonian Icefield - Argentina
 Cordillera Paine IV – South Patagonian Icefield - Argentina
 Cordillera Paine V – South Patagonian Icefield - Argentina
 Cordillera Paine VI – South Patagonian Icefield - Argentina

 Rio Laguna  – Chile
 Rio Seco at Rio Laguna - Chile
 Ojos de Agua  - Chile
 Portillo  - Chile
 Guardia Vieja   - Chile
 Salto del Soldado   - Chile

References

Moraines of Canada
Moraines of the United States
Geography-related lists